Ingunn Ringvold  (born 19 October 1979) is a roots singer, musician and songwriter from Norway. She plays piano, harmonium, guitar, dulcimer, djembe and qanon.

Musical career

Record deal 

Ringvold signed with Voices of Wonder in 2008 and within the same year her debut album Girl In Sailor Suit was released. The record was produced by Are Fevang from Ila Auto, recorded in Oslo, Norway and Los Angeles. The single "I Need A Ride" was listed NRK P1, the largest public radio station in Norway.

November 1, 2010 her second album Tea Leaves was released, recorded in Lund (Sweden), Oslo (Norway) and Portland (USA). The album was produced by Mark Olson.

Ingunn Ringvold's third album Drove Long To See Him was released June 2, 2012 on her own record label; Coral Ring Records. The album was produced by Øyvind Storli Hoel.

Concerts and touring 

Ingunn Ringvold has toured and played shows and festivals in Norway, Switzerland and Australia.

Mark Olsen
In 2006, Ringvold joined singer/songwriter Mark Olson and toured all over the States, Europe and Australia as part of his group.

She and Mark Olsen married and they lived in Joshua Tree in California from where they released their joint album Magdalen Accepts The Invitation in 2020.

Discography

Albums 
 Girl In Sailor Suit, Voices of Wonder, 2008
 Tea Leaves, Voices of Wonder, 2010
 Drove Long To See Him, 2012
 Magdalen Accepts The Invitation, 2020 (with Mark Olsen)

Singles 
 "I Need A Ride", Voices of Wonder, 2008

References

External links 
 Official site
 Kvalitetscountry på internasjonalt nivå review in abcnyheter.no
 Feiende flott debut review Tromsø By
 Solid og stilsikker debut review Dagbladet
 Skapte stemning på fjellet Slottsfjellfestivalen
 Varmer opp for Big Bang Østlandsposten

1979 births
Living people
Norwegian musicians
21st-century Norwegian singers
21st-century Norwegian women singers